Grand Street is a street in Lower Manhattan, New York City. It runs west/east parallel to and south of Delancey Street, from SoHo through Chinatown, Little Italy, the Bowery, and the Lower East Side.  The street's western terminus is Varick Street, and on the east it ends at the service road for the FDR Drive.

History and description
Grand Street was once part of the lands of James De Lancey, Jr. When his sister Ann married Judge Thomas Jones he gave them a two-acre estate known as "Mount Pitt", near the site of present day Pitt and Grand Streets. It was one of the highest natural points on Manhattan island. In early 1776, a circular redoubt was built there, where General Joseph Spencer established a battery. The British captured the defenses the following November and renamed it Jones Hill Fort. The hill was later leveled and some of the field stone used for the construction of St. Augustine's Church on Henry Street.

Bayard Mount at the site of present day Grand and Mott Streets was the tallest hill in lower Manhattan, and overlooked the Collect Pond. In April 1776, the Bayard’s Hill redoubt, (also known as Fort Bunker Hill) was constructed as part of the defenses across Manhattan Island. After the war, this became a popular site for dueling. In 1802 work began on leveling Mount Bayard.

St. Mary's Catholic Church is located at 438-440 Grand Street between Pitt and Attorney Streets. The parish was established in 1826 to serve Irish immigrants living in the neighborhood, it is the third oldest Catholic parish in New York. The church itself was built in 1832-33, and its facade replaced in 1871 by the noted architect Patrick Charles Keely.  The original portion is the second oldest Roman Catholic structure in the city, after St. Patrick's Old Cathedral, which was built in 1815.

Ferrara Bakery and Cafe was established at 195 Grand Street in 1892.

The Bowery Savings Bank building at 130 Bowery, extending to Grand and Elizabeth Streets, was designed by Stanford White of the architecture firm of McKim, Mead & White, and built in 1893–95. It is a New York City designated landmark and on the National Register of Historic Places.

Kossar's Bialys was founded in 1936.
 

Cooperative Village, a collection of housing cooperatives, covers several blocks near the eastern portion of Grand Street. Other notable buildings include the old Police Headquarters Building, the Home Savings of America building, the and the Bialystoker Synagogue.

Grand Street is one-way to motor vehicles west of Chrystie Street and two-way to its east. Grand Street the location of an on-street bikeway which, west of Chrystie street, is between a lane of parked vehicles and the curb, and east of Chrystie Street, is indicated by shared lane markings of various types.

Transportation
In the 19th century, before the construction of the Williamsburg Bridge, the Grand Street Ferry connected Grand Street to its counterpart in Brooklyn.

The M14A SBS runs on Grand Street east of Essex Street.

See also 
 Forty-Second Street and Grand Street Ferry Railroad

References
Notes

External links

Grand Street storefronts (photos of stores and properties on Grand Street)
New York Songlines: Grand Street, a virtual walking tour

Streets in Manhattan
 
SoHo, Manhattan
Little Saigons
Lower East Side